Kusasi may refer to:
 Kusasi people
 Kusaal language